Camptoscelis is a genus of beetles in the family Carabidae, found in South Africa.

Species
 Camptoscelis dissidens Peringuey, 1926
 Camptoscelis hottentotta (Olivier, 1795)

References

Pterostichinae